This is a list of municipalities in Bosnia and Herzegovina which have standing links to local communities in other countries known as "town twinning" (usually in Europe) or "sister cities" (usually in the rest of the world).

B
Banja Luka

 Bari, Italy
 Belgrade, Serbia
 Bitonto, Italy
 Campobasso, Italy
 Kaiserslautern, Germany
 Kranj, Slovenia
 Kumanovo, North Macedonia
 Lviv, Ukraine
 Modi'in-Maccabim-Re'ut, Israel
 New Belgrade (Belgrade), Serbia
 North Mitrovica, Kosovo
 Patras, Greece
 Sremska Mitrovica, Serbia
 Zemun (Belgrade), Serbia

Banovići

 Bečej, Serbia
 Labin, Croatia

Bihać

 Bondeno, Italy
 Kikinda, Serbia
 Kuşadası, Turkey
 Nagykanizsa, Hungary
 Novo Mesto, Slovenia
 Reșița, Romania
 Villefranche-de-Rouergue, France

Bijeljina

 Azov, Russia
 Brașov, Romania
 Budva, Montenegro
 Goraždevac (Peja), Kosovo
 Kosjerić, Serbia
 Kruševac, Serbia
 Kumanovo, North Macedonia
 Langenhagen, Germany
 Leskovac, Serbia
 Ruse, Bulgaria
 Zrenjanin, Serbia

Brčko

 Samsun, Turkey
 Smederevska Palanka, Serbia
 St. Louis, United States

C
Čapljina

 Koprivnica, Croatia
 Požega, Croatia
 Vrhnika, Slovenia

Cazin

 Develi, Turkey
 Kahramanmaraş, Turkey

Čitluk

 Fossò, Italy
 Križevci, Croatia
 Poggio San Marcello, Italy

D
Derventa
 Pinerolo, Italy

Doboj

 Celje, Slovenia
 Ćuprija, Serbia

G
Goražde

 Delčevo, North Macedonia
 Gaziemir, Turkey
 Gera, Germany
 Güngören, Turkey
 Karatay, Turkey
 Keçiören, Turkey
 Maragheh, Iran
 Şahinbey, Turkey
 Stari Grad (Sarajevo), Bosnia and Herzegovina

Gornji Vakuf-Uskoplje

 Neuhofen an der Krems, Austria
 Paks, Hungary
 Sancaktepe, Turkey
 Turgutlu, Turkey

Gračanica

 Fleury-les-Aubrais, France
 Formia, Italy
 Pljevlja, Montenegro

Gradačac

 Düren, Germany

 Sivas, Turkey
 Stryi, Ukraine

Gradiška

 Ćuprija, Serbia
 Kavala, Greece
 Montesilvano, Italy
 Negotino, North Macedonia
 Palilula (Belgrade), Serbia
 Zubin Potok, Kosovo

H
Hadžići

 Hacılar, Turkey
 Meram, Turkey
 Reus, Spain

I
Ilidža

 Çekmeköy, Turkey
 İzmit, Turkey

J
Jablanica

 Başiskele, Turkey
 Gevgelija, North Macedonia
 Inđija, Serbia
 Paraćin, Serbia

Jajce

 Alaçatı (Çeşme), Turkey
 Hallsberg, Sweden
 Kutná Hora, Czech Republic
 Ottensheim, Austria
 Piacenza, Italy
 Szekszárd, Hungary
 Tomislavgrad, Bosnia and Herzegovina
 Virovitica, Croatia
 Zenica, Bosnia and Herzegovina

K
Konjic

 Altınova, Turkey
 Karacabey, Turkey
 Tivat, Montenegro

Kupres

 Baška Voda, Croatia
 Gospić, Croatia
 Kaštela, Croatia
 Valpovo, Croatia

L
Laktaši

 Budva, Montenegro
 Čajetina, Serbia

 Lehavim, Israel
 Seiersberg-Pirka, Austria
 Veria, Greece
 Zrenjanin, Serbia

Lukavac

 Ulcinj, Montenegro
 Velenje, Slovenia

M
Maglaj
 Çubuk, Turkey

Mostar

 Amman, Jordan
 Antalya, Turkey
 Arsoli, Italy
 İzmir, Turkey
 Kayseri, Turkey
 Montegrotto Terme, Italy
 Ohrid, North Macedonia
 Osijek, Croatia
 Orkland, Norway
 Split, Croatia
 Tutin, Serbia
 Vukovar, Croatia

P
Prijedor

 Bovec, Slovenia
 Centro Storico – Piedicastello (Trento), Italy
 Demir Hisar, North Macedonia
 Kikinda, Serbia
 Irkutsk, Russia
 Manisa, Turkey
 Ningbo, China
 Øygarden, Norway
 Pančevo, Serbia
 Velenje, Slovenia

Prnjavor

 Boleslawiec, Poland
 Boskovice, Czech Republic
 Zhydachiv, Ukraine

S
Sarajevo

 Ankara, Turkey
 Baku, Azerbaijan
 Barcelona, Spain
 Budapest, Hungary
 Bursa, Turkey
 Collegno, Italy
 Coventry, England, United Kingdom
 Dayton, United States
 Doha, Qatar
 Ferrara, Italy
 Friedrichshafen, Germany
 Innsbruck, Austria
 Istanbul, Turkey
 Kuwait City, Kuwait
 Madrid, Spain
 Magdeburg, Germany
 Prato, Italy
 Pula, Croatia
 Skopje, North Macedonia
 Tehran, Iran
 Tianjin, China
 Tirana, Albania
 Tlemcen, Algeria
 Tripoli, Libya
 Venice, Italy

Sarajevo – Novi Grad

 Beyoğlu, Turkey
 Tuzla, Turkey

Sarajevo – Novo Sarajevo
 Cetinje, Montenegro

Sarajevo – Stari Grad

 Alexeyevsky (Moscow), Russia
 Bosanska Krupa, Bosnia and Herzegovina
 Budva, Montenegro
 Castagneto Carducci, Italy
 District 12 (Tehran), Iran
 Fatih, Turkey
 Galateia, Cyprus
 Gostivar, North Macedonia
 Karamürsel, Turkey
 Karpoš (Skopje), North Macedonia
 Kepez, Turkey
 Kragujevac, Serbia
 Krujë, Albania
 Makarska, Croatia
 Mamak, Turkey

 Ohrid, North Macedonia
 Olovo, Bosnia and Herzegovina
 Osmangazi, Turkey
 Peja, Kosovo
 Selçuklu, Turkey
 Silivri, Turkey
 Ulcinj, Montenegro
 Ümraniye, Turkey

Široki Brijeg
 Vinkovci, Croatia

T
Tomislavgrad

 Biograd na Moru, Croatia
 Bjelovar, Croatia
 Đakovo, Croatia
 Jajce, Bosnia and Herzegovina
 Knin, Croatia
 Nin, Croatia
 Novska, Croatia
 Solin, Croatia

Travnik

 İzmit, Turkey
 Karpoš (Skopje), North Macedonia
 Kırıkkale, Turkey
 Leipzig, Germany
 Makarska, Croatia
 Pendik, Turkey
 Police nad Metují, Czech Republic
 Yalova, Turkey

Tuzla

 Beşiktaş, Turkey
 Bologna, Italy
 L'Hospitalet de Llobregat, Spain
 Linz, Austria
 Osijek, Croatia
 Pécs, Hungary
 Saint-Denis, France
 Tuzla, Turkey

U
Ugljevik
 Beočin, Serbia

V
Velika Kladuša

 Cetinje, Montenegro
 Krnjak, Croatia

Visoko

 Altındağ, Turkey
 Bjelovar, Croatia
 Kartal, Turkey

Vogošća

 Çekmeköy, Turkey
 İzmit, Turkey

Z
Zavidovići

 Berane, Montenegro
 Bozüyük, Turkey
 Gemlik, Turkey
 Kakanj, Bosnia and Herzegovina
 Nilüfer, Turkey
 Roncadelle, Italy
 Wiltz, Luxembourg
 Yunusemre, Turkey

Zenica

 Fiorenzuola d'Arda, Italy
 Gelsenkirchen, Germany
 Hunedoara, Romania
 Jajce, Bosnia and Herzegovina
 Karşıyaka, Turkey
 Luleå, Sweden
 Üsküdar, Turkey
 Veles, North Macedonia
 Zalaegerszeg, Hungary

Notes

References

Bosnia and Herzegovina
Bosnia and Herzegovina geography-related lists
Foreign relations of Bosnia and Herzegovina
Populated places in Bosnia and Herzegovina
Cities and towns in Bosnia and Herzegovina